Sarangdanda  is a village development committee in Panchthar District in the Mechi Zone of eastern Nepal. At the time of the 1991 Nepal census it had a population of 5184 people living in 965 individual households.

References

Populated places in Panchthar District